Obsidian Cliff, also known as 48YE433, was an important source of lithic materials for prehistoric peoples in Yellowstone National Park near Mammoth Hot Springs, Wyoming, United States.  The cliff was named by Philetus Norris, the second park superintendent in 1878. It was declared a National Historic Landmark in 1996.

The cliff was formed from thick rhyolite lava flow that occurred about 180,000 years ago. The vertical columns are cooling fractures that formed as the thick lava flow cooled and crystallized. The cliffs also extend between 150 and 200 feet above Obsidian Creek. The flow consists of obsidian, a dark volcanic glass. The obsidian is most abundant at the base of the cliff and slowly tapers off to larger concentrations of pumice at the top. Obsidian from this site was first quarried here about 12,000 years ago. Early natives of North America placed a high value on the obsidian that came from this cliff as well as other similar obsidian deposits in the area because numerous tools could be fashioned from obsidian—most popularly, knives, spear/arrow tips, and other sharp-edged objects. In fact, obsidian from Obsidian Cliff was so sought after in early America (before the time of Columbus) that it was traded as far away as Ohio and Canada.

Many studies have been done on the composition of the obsidian from Obsidian Cliff and how the obsidian from Obsidian Cliff was distributed. This research has provided evidence of the direction and extent of prehistoric trade networks.

The Obsidian Cliff Kiosk, just north, is also listed on the National Register. Obsidian Cliff is also located on the northern end of Beaver Lake in Yellowstone National Park.

Notes

External links
 
 Obsidian Cliff National Historic Landmark at the Wyoming State Historic Preservation Office

Landforms of Yellowstone National Park
Cliffs of the United States
Landforms of Park County, Wyoming
Volcanism of Wyoming
Native American history of Wyoming
National Historic Landmarks in Wyoming
Natural features on the National Register of Historic Places in Wyoming
Archaeological sites on the National Register of Historic Places in Wyoming
National Register of Historic Places in Park County, Wyoming
Cliff
Quarries in the United States